Buhran is a location in Saudi Arabia. During the Islamic prophet Muhammad's era the Nakhla raid took place here.

See also
Invasion of Buhran
List of expeditions of Muhammad

References

Populated places in Mecca Province
Islam in Saudi Arabia